Majuba: Heuwel van Duiwe (Majuba: Hill of Doves), is a 1968 South African War drama film directed by David Millin and co-produced by Roscoe C. Behrmann and Hyman Kirstein. The film stars Roland Robinson, Reinet Maasdorp, and Patrick Mynhardt in lead roles along with Siegfried Mynhardt, Anna Neethling-Pohl and Morné Coetzer in supportive roles.

The film was inspired by real events of the First Boer War which included the Battle of Bronkhorstspruit, the Battle of Laing's Nek and the Battle of Majuba Hill. The film received positive reviews and won several awards at international film festivals.

The film's original cinema release version ran to almost three hours yet its local distributors cut the film down to have more daily screenings as it was immensely popular: the shortened version is all that remains of the original cut and the excised footage was never archived.

Gallery

Cast
 Roland Robinson as Dirk van der Berg
 Reinet Maasdorp as Lena du Toit
 Patrick Mynhardt as Rolf du Toit
 Siegfried Mynhardt as Philippus du Toit
 Anna Neethling-Pohl as Katryn du Toit
 Morné Coetzer as Louis du Toit 
 James White as Boetie van der Berg
 Tromp Terre'blanche as Groot Dirk van der Berg
 Virgo du Plessis as Tanta Johanna van der Berg
 Thandi Brewer as Klein Johanna
 Francis Coertze as Tanta Martha
 Petrina Fry as Mrs. Brenner
 Eric Cordell as Mr. Brenner
 Kerry Jordan as Col. Philip Anstruther
 Pieter Hauptfleisch as Commandant Frans Joubert
 June Neethling as Stephanie
 Morrison Gampu as Reuter
 Hugh Rouse as Lieutenant - Doornkloof
 Anthony James as Maj. Gen. Sir George Pomeroy Colley
 Ian Yule as Deserter
 George Jackson as Deserter Thomas
 Peter Tobin as Col. Stewart
 Willie van Rensburg as Commandant Smit
 Lance Lockhart-Ross as Maj. Fraser
 Lourens Schultz as Commandant General Piet Joubert
 Esmé Euvrard as Spotter
 Adrian Steed as Melton Prior, war correspondent
 Elizabeth Hamilton as Edith Colley
 Kenneth Baker as Capt. Lang 
 Brian Brooke as Captain - Brennersdorp
 Johan du Plooy as Hans
 Jaco van der Westhuizen as Willem

References

External links
 
 Majuba: Heuwel van Duiwe in YouTube

1968 films
1968 drama films
South African drama films
Afrikaans-language films
English-language South African films
Films set in 1881